Altropane (O-587, IACFT, 2β-carbomethoxy-3β-(4-fluorophenyl)-N-((E)-3-iodo-prop-2-enyl)tropane) is a phenyltropane derivative which acts as a potent dopamine reuptake inhibitor and long-acting stimulant drug. It has mainly been used as the 125I radiolabelled form for mapping the distribution of dopamine transporters in the brain, and consequently this has led to its development as a potential diagnostic tool for early detection of Parkinson's disease. It is also being investigated for potential use in the diagnosis and treatment of attention deficit hyperactivity disorder (ADHD).

References 

Tropanes
Dopamine reuptake inhibitors
Medical imaging
Neuroimaging
Organoiodides